Mateusz Szwed (born 10 February 2000) is a Polish professional footballer who plays as a midfielder for III liga club Chełmianka Chełm.

Club career
Born in Chełm, Szwed started his career at Niedźwiadek Chełm before joining the youth teams of Legia Warsaw at the age of 13. He was released by the club in December 2018 following the expiration of his contract. Szwed signed for Zagłębie Sosnowiec in March 2019.

International career
Szwed has made two appearances for Poland at under-17 level.

Career statistics

Club

References

Living people
2000 births
People from Chełm
Sportspeople from Lublin Voivodeship
Polish footballers
Poland youth international footballers
Association football midfielders
Legia Warsaw players
Legia Warsaw II players
Zagłębie Sosnowiec players
Chełmianka Chełm players
I liga players
III liga players
Cypriot Second Division players
Polish expatriate footballers
Expatriate footballers in Cyprus
Polish expatriate sportspeople in Cyprus